Aghbolagh-e Suqar (also Romanized as Āghbolāgh-e Sūqār and Āghbolāgh-e Sūqqār) is a village in Qarah Quyun-e Shomali Rural District, in the Central District of Showt County, West Azerbaijan Province, Iran. At the 2006 census, its population was 34, in 5 families.

References 

Populated places in Showt County